An anankastic conditional is a grammatical construction of the form

If you want X, you have to do Y.

where Y is required in order to get X, insisting a peremptory conditionate.  For example:

If you wanna be my lover, you gotta get with my friends.

Notes

External links

Opiniatrety If You Want To Get To Sugar Hill in Harlem

Grammar
Semantics
Conditionals in linguistics
Linguistic modality
Grammatical construction types